Lambert Township is a township in Red Lake County, Minnesota, United States. The population was 154 at the 2000 census.

Lambert Township bears the name of Francois Lambert, a county official.

Geography

Demographics
As of the census of 2000, there were 154 people, 64 households, and 44 families residing in the township. The population density was 4.3 people per square mile (1.7/km2). There were 69 housing units at an average density of 1.9/sq mi (0.7/km2). The racial makeup of the township was 100.00% White.

There were 64 households, out of which 18.8% had children under the age of 18 living with them, 60.9% were married couples living together, 3.1% had a female householder with no husband present, and 29.7% were non-families. 23.4% of all households were made up of individuals, and 12.5% had someone living alone who was 65 years of age or older. The average household size was 2.41 and the average family size was 2.80.

In the township the population was spread out, with 18.8% under the age of 18, 8.4% from 18 to 24, 23.4% from 25 to 44, 35.1% from 45 to 64, and 14.3% who were 65 years of age or older. The median age was 44 years. For every 100 females, there were 126.5 males. For every 100 females age 18 and over, there were 135.8 males.

The median income for a household in the township was $33,750, and the median income for a family was $35,000. Males had a median income of $26,250 versus $20,781 for females. The per capita income for the township was $15,888. None of the families and 1.4% of the population were living below the poverty line.

References

Townships in Red Lake County, Minnesota
Townships in Minnesota